General elections were held in Anguilla on 22 April 2015. The result was a victory for the Anguilla United Front alliance, which won six of the seven elected seats in the House of Assembly. The ruling Anguilla United Movement failed to win a seat.

Electoral system
At the time of the elections the House of Assembly had eleven members, of which seven are elected in single-member constituencies and four were appointed. Voters had to be at least 18 years old, whilst candidates had to be at least 21.

Results

By constituency
The closest contest was in the Road North constituency, where the AUF candidate Evalie Bradley won by a single vote against the AUM candidate Patrick Hanley.

Aftermath
Following the elections, Victor Banks of the Anguilla United Front was sworn in as the island's new Chief Minister.

References

Anguilla
2015 in Anguilla
Elections in Anguilla
Anguilla
April 2015 events in North America